The word mark, followed by number, is a method of designating a version of a product.  It is often abbreviated as Mk or M. This use of the word possibly originates from the use of physical marks made to measure height or progress. Furthermore, by metonymy the word mark is used to note a defined level of development or a model number.

The kind of products that use this convention vary widely in complexity. The concept shares some similarities with the type designation (in hardware), also called software versioning: 1.0+ (1.1, 1.12, 2.0, 3.0, etc.), used to designate general software product releases, and other version control schemas. Thus designations like "Mark I", "Mark II", "Mark III", "Mark IV", etc. come to be used as proper names for persons and products.

Application 
Mark refers to a mark on the modification plate of a system, component or machine.  Modification plates are used to identify which modifications have already been applied to the device, either at the factory or by maintainers.  The use of Mark as a method of versioning has entered common usage however, and may be applied to devices without a modification plate to physically mark.

United Kingdom
In British military practice, Mark ("Mk") designations were given in Roman numerals (replaced by Arabic numerals in 1944) to reflect variants of or production changes to service weaponry, either on their own or as part of numerical ("No.") designations; in the Lee-Enfield rifle series for example, the SMLE rifles were produced to Mk I, Mk III, and Mk V specification (with the latter two later gaining a numerical designation of "No. 1 Mk III/Mk V Rifle"), while the No .4 rifles were produced to No. 4 Mk I and No. 4 Mk 2 specification. Variations or production changes could be further denoted with an asterix as with the SMLE Mk III* (later "No. 1 Mk III*") and No. 4 Mk I*. The British military switched to Land Service or "L" number ("LXA1/A2/A3/etc.") designations in 1954, but items such as the No. 8 Mk 1 0.22in Rifle, No. 80 Mk 1 White Phosphorus Smoke Hand Grenade, No. 1 Mk 3 6 Inch Beehive Demolition Charge, and No. 14 Mk 1 11 lb Hayrick Demolition Charge continued to be referred to by their numerical designations until replacement.

British railway coaching stock has been referred to using Arabic numeral marks following the introduction of the British Railways Mark 1 in 1951, with further designs being referred to as the Mark 2 (introduced in 1964), the Mark 3 (introduced in 1975), and the Mark 4 (introduced in 1989). The Mark 5 designation was initially intended for coaches belonging to the 1990 InterCity 250 project, but this was cancelled in 1992; the designation was later applied to CAF-built coaches used on the Caledonian Sleeper service since 2019, replacing earlier Mark 2 and Mark 3 coaches, while coaches built by the same manufacturer for TransPennine Express are referred to as the Mark 5A.

United States Navy
The United States Navy uses the terms "MARK" and "MOD" as a method to uniquely designate specific types and configurations of equipment that would otherwise lack military designations.  The practice was adopted by the Naval Ordnance group in 1944, and was formalized in the MIL-STD-1661 MARK and MOD Nomenclature System
 in 1978.  As the system came from the Ordnance group, it is primarily used to describe naval guns, gun mounts, and other similar weapon systems.

Examples

Military

Mark I combat tank (British Army)
Mk 2 grenade (an American grenade used in World War II, Korean War and the Vietnam War)
Mark III, Merkava main battle tank (Israel Defense Forces)
Mark 4 aerial atomic bomb, several United States atomic gravity bombs employed a Mark-# scheme (USAF)
Mk V anti-tank mine (British Army)
Mk 6 Assault Boat (British Army)
Mark 7 nuclear bomb
Mk VIII cruiser tank (British Army)
Mk 11 Sniper Weapon System (US Armed Forces)
Mark 12 Mod X Special Purpose Rifle (US Special Operations Forces)
Mk 13 missile launcher (anti-ship/anti-aircraft) (US Navy)
Mark 14 Mod 0 Enhanced Battle Rifle (US Armed Forces)
Mk 16 SCAR-L and Mk 17 SCAR-H assault rifle and battle rifle commissioned by the US armed forces
Mk 18 CQBR M4A1 Receiver upgrade (US Armed Forces)
Mk 19 grenade launcher (US Armed Forces)
Mark 48 torpedo as well as other torpedoes used by the British and US Navies

Vehicles

 The AC Cars Cobra — MkI, MkII and MkIII
 The Ford GT40 series — MkI, MkII, MkIII and MkIV
 Various Jaguar Cars  — Jaguar Mark 2, Jaguar Mark IV, Jaguar Mark X, etc.
 The Lincoln Mark series - Continental Mark II, Lincoln Mark VIII, Lincoln MKX, etc.
 Various Lola Cars - Mk.4, Mk.5, Mk.6
 Various Toyota vehicles, especially the MR2 — MkI, MkII, MkIII
 Volkswagen Golf automobile — Mk1, Mk2, Mk3, Mk4, Mk5, Mk6, Mk7
 British Rail Coaches  — Mark 1, Mark 4, etc.
 The Walt Disney World Monorails - Mark IV and Mark VI.

Musical and photo instruments
 Rhodes piano — Mark I, Mark II
 Mesa Boogie Mark Series — guitar amplifiers, Mark I to Mark V
 Telharmonium, an early electronic musical instrument, Mark I to III
 SELMER Saxophones — Mark VI and Mark VII Series of saxophones
 Elektron music machines — Mk II versions of the Monomachine synthesizer and the Machinedrum drum machine
 Canon EOS-1D series — 1Ds Mk II, 1D Mk III, 1Ds Mk III, etc.

Firearms

 Ruger Standard series (Ruger MK I, Ruger MK II, Ruger MK III)
 Weatherby Mark V

Electronics
 Harvard Mark I, Mark II, Mark III, and Mark IV, early computers designed by Howard Aiken at Harvard University from 1937 to 1952
 Navigation system on BMW cars - Mk I, Mk II, Mk III and Mk IV

Medical research
 The term SARS‑CoV‑2 for the novel Coronavirus may be considered part of this designating method. The term COVID-19 has been misinterpreted in this way on several occasions; the number here, however, denotes the year of the first appearance of the virus, 2019.

See also

British military aircraft designation systems
Army Nomenclature System
Mark I
Mark II
Mark III
Mark IV
Mark V
Mark VI
Mark VII
Mark VIII
Mark IX
Mark X
Mark XI
Mark XII
Mark XIII
Mark XIV
Mark XV
Mark XVI
Mark XVII
Mark XVIII
Mark XIX
Model
Type (designation)

References

External links

 Miscellaneous designation systems

Technical terminology